Hanoi is a city with a diverse system of high schools; including public schools, private schools, specialized schools and schools with foreign elements.

Specialized high schools 
There are currently 9 specialized high schools in Hanoi.

Public high schools 
This is a type of school invested by the State, Central or Local level in economic investment. Non-business expenses and facilities operate mainly from public funding. That is, public financial sources or nonprofit contributions.

Financially autonomous

Non-public high schools 
Non-public schools include 2 types:

 People-founded high schools: are established by grassroots population communities, invest in building material foundations and ensure operation funding.
 Private high schools: established by social organizations, socio-professional organizations, economic organizations, domestic and foreign investors or individuals, invested in construction of infrastructure and business assurance operating fee with non-state budget capital.

Foreign-owned high schools are private schools with foreign-invested capital, teaching a number of subjects under foreign programs, teaching programs integrated with foreign programs, appraised by the Ministry of Education and Training and licensing. Some schools have invested in Vietnam but registered with international organizations to become an international curriculum school. These schools are internationally recognized and licensed to become member schools in Vietnam.

International high schools 
In Vietnam, there is no specific definition for this type of school. However, the Ministry of Education and Training confirmed that only 12 schools were considered international in Hanoi, these schools were 100% foreign invested or some were established by the Inter-Ministry of Education and Training and the Ministry of Foreign Affairs; taught by foreign programs (taught in foreign languages).

References 

High schools in Hanoi